Tao Wei (January 11, 1966 – August 27, 2012) was a Chinese professional footballer, who played as a midfielder, and commentator for CCTV sports channel.

Career
Tao began playing professionally for home team Beijing Football Team and China national under-20 football team at 1980s. He transferred to Tahiti Division Fédérale club AS Dragon at 1992. Tao joined Sichuan Quanxing in 1994, when the first season of Chinese professional football league Chinese Jia-A League began.

Tao retired from his playing career in 1996. In 1999, he launched a youth football club called Huijia Cheetah (汇佳猎豹). He went on to become active as a commentator, providing analysis to CCTV sports channel for Fußball-Bundesliga.

Personal life
Tao married the Chinese actress Lü Liping in Los Angeles, on January 16, 1999. They divorced on August 2, 2001. He remarried in August 2011 and his son was born in March 2012, five months before his death.

Death
Tao was found dead at a hotel in Jinan, Shandong province on August 27, 2012. After investigation, local police concluded that there was no evidence of homicide or suicide, the cause of death was sudden cardiac death.

References

External links
Gong Lei and Tao Wei, Chinese players who played in Tahiti League 
Tao Wei's Blog 

1966 births
2012 deaths
Chinese footballers
Footballers from Beijing
Chinese association football commentators
Sichuan Guancheng players
Association football midfielders
Chinese expatriate footballers
Expatriate footballers in French Polynesia
Chinese expatriate sportspeople in French Polynesia